Guadalupe y Calvo is one of the 67 municipalities of Chihuahua, in northern Mexico. The municipal seat lies at Guadalupe y Calvo. The municipality covers an area of 9,165.1 km².

As of 2010, the municipality had a total population of 53,499, up from 51,854 as of 2005.

As of 2010, the town of Guadalupe y Calvo had a population of 5,816. Other than the town of Guadalupe y Calvo, the municipality had 1,416 localities, the largest of which (with 2010 populations in parentheses) were: Baborigame (3,294), classified as urban, and Atascaderos (1,559), Las Yerbitas (Aserradero) (1,200), and Turuachi (1,131), classified as rural.

Geography

Towns and villages
The municipality has 1,086 localities. The largest are:

References

Municipalities of Chihuahua (state)